Seal Bay is a bay which indents the northeastern end of Riiser-Larsen Ice Shelf just southward of Cape Norvegia, on the coast of Queen Maud Land. It was discovered in the year 1930 by Capt. Hjalmar Riiser-Larsen and so named by him because of the abundance of seals in the bay.

References

Bays of Queen Maud Land
Princess Astrid Coast